Eden, as a given name, has several derivations, from the Biblical Garden of Eden, meaning 'delight'; It is given to girls and boys. The first recorded use is from ancient Israel in the book of Genesis.

Given name
Notable people with the given name Eden:

 Eden Ahbez (1908–1995), performance name of American musician George Alexander Aberle
 Eden Alene (born 2000), Israeli singer
 Eden Bleazard (1855–1946), New Zealand artist
 Eden Brekke (1893–1978), superintendent of Parks and Alderman of the 37th Ward, Chicago
 Eden Colvile (1819–1893), Canadian historic figure, grandson of William Eden
 Eden Espinosa (born 1978), American singer and stage actress
 Eden Harel (born 1976), MTV Europe VJ during the 1990s
 Eden Hazard (born 1991), Belgian and Real Madrid CF football player
 Eden Kane (born 1940), stage name of Richard Sarstedt, English singer
 Eden Kuriakose, Indian film actress
 Eden McCain, a character from the American television series, Heroes
 Eden Natan-Zada (1986-2005), IDF soldier that convicted mass murder incident
 Eden Paul, British Physician and Writer
 Eden Phillpotts (1862–1960), British novelist, poet and dramatist
 Eden Rainbow-Cooper (born 2001), English wheelchair racer
 Eden Riegel (born 1981), American actress
 Eden Sher (born 1991), American television actress
 Eden Taylor-Draper (born 1997), English actress

Family name

Notable people with the family name Eden:

 Eden baronets, two English baronetcy families
William Eden, 1st Baron Auckland (1745–1814), British diplomat
Anthony Eden (1897–1977), British prime minister during the Suez crisis
 Barbara Eden (born 1931), American actress
 Bobbi Eden (born 1980), Dutch adult movie actress
 Charles Eden (disambiguation)
 Clarissa Eden (1920–2021), wife of Anthony Eden
 David Eden, producer of professional bass guitar sound amplification equipment
 Denis Eden (1878–1949), English painter
 Eleanor Eden (died 1851), society beauty
 Emily Eden (1797–1869), English poet and novelist
 Frederick Eden (disambiguation)
 George Eden, 1st Earl of Auckland (1784–1849), British politician
 Harry Eden (born 1990), British actor
 Harry Eden (rugby league) (1943–2006), Australian rugby league player
 Jaap Eden (1873–1925), Dutch athlete
 Jessie Eden (1902–1987), British trade union leader and activist
 Joanna Eden, English jazz singer
 Mark Eden (1928–2021), English actor
 Michael Eden (born 1961), Australian rugby league player
 Mike Eden (baseball) (born 1949), former major league baseball player for the San Francisco Giants
 Philip Eden (1951–2018), British meteorologist
 Robert John Eden, 3rd Baron Auckland (1799–1870), Bishop of Bath and Wells
 Roger Edens (1905–1970), Hollywood composer and arranger
 Simone Eden (born 1970), American model and actress

References

Surnames
Unisex given names
Modern names of Hebrew origin
Given names of Hebrew language origin
English unisex given names
English masculine given names
English feminine given names